In topology, the degree of a continuous mapping between two compact oriented manifolds of the same dimension is a number that represents the number of times that the domain manifold wraps around the range manifold under the mapping.  The degree is always an integer, but may be positive or negative depending on the orientations.

The degree of a map was first defined by Brouwer, who showed that the degree is homotopy invariant (invariant among homotopies), and used it to prove the Brouwer fixed point theorem.  In modern mathematics, the degree of a map plays an important role in topology and geometry.  In physics, the degree of a continuous map (for instance a map from space to some order parameter set) is one example of a topological quantum number.

Definitions of the degree

From Sn to Sn

The simplest and most important case is the degree of a continuous map from the -sphere  to itself (in the case , this is called the winding number):

Let  be a continuous map. Then  induces a homomorphism , where  is the th homology group. Considering the fact that , we see that  must be of the form  for some fixed .

Between manifolds

Algebraic topology 

Let X and Y be closed connected oriented m-dimensional manifolds. Orientability of a manifold implies that its top homology group is isomorphic to Z. Choosing an orientation means choosing a generator of the top homology group.

A continuous map f : X →Y induces a homomorphism f∗ from  Hm(X) to Hm(Y). Let [X], resp. [Y] be the chosen generator of Hm(X), resp. Hm(Y) (or the fundamental class of X, Y). Then the degree of f is defined to be f*([X]). In other words,

If y in Y and f −1(y) is a finite set, the degree of f can be computed by considering the m-th local homology groups of X at each point in f −1(y).

Differential topology 

In the language of differential topology, the degree of a smooth map can be defined as follows: If f is a smooth map whose domain is a compact manifold and p is a regular value of f, consider the finite set

By p being a regular value, in a neighborhood of each xi the map f is a local diffeomorphism (it is a covering map). Diffeomorphisms can be either orientation preserving or orientation reversing. Let r be the number of points xi at which f is orientation preserving  and s be the number at which f is orientation reversing. When the codomain of f is connected, the number r − s is independent of the choice of p (though n is not!) and one defines the degree of f to be r − s. This definition coincides with the algebraic topological definition above.

The same definition works for compact manifolds with boundary but then f should send the boundary of X to the boundary of Y.

One can also define degree modulo 2 (deg2(f)) the same way as before but taking the fundamental class in Z2 homology. In this case deg2(f) is an element of Z2 (the field with two elements), the manifolds need not be orientable and if n is the number of preimages of p as before then deg2(f) is n modulo 2.

Integration of differential forms gives a pairing between (C∞-)singular homology and de Rham cohomology: , where  is a homology class represented by a cycle  and  a closed form representing a de Rham cohomology class. For a smooth map f : X →Y between orientable m-manifolds, one has

where f∗ and f∗ are induced maps on chains and forms respectively. Since f∗[X] = deg f · [Y], we have

for any m-form ω on Y.

Maps from closed region

The degree satisfies the following properties: 
 If , then there exists  such that .
  for all .
 The function  is locally constant on 

These properties characterise the degree uniquely and the degree may be defined by them in an axiomatic way.

In a similar way, we could define the degree of a map between compact oriented manifolds with boundary.

Properties
The degree of a map is a homotopy invariant; moreover for continuous maps from the sphere to itself it is a complete homotopy invariant, i.e. two maps  are homotopic if and only if .

Moreover, the Hopf theorem states that for any -dimensional closed oriented manifold M, two maps  are homotopic if and only if 

A self-map  of the n-sphere is extendable to a map  from the n-ball to the n-sphere if and only if .

Calculating the degree 
An implementation of the algorithm is available in TopDeg  - a software tool for computing the degree (LGPL-3).

See also
Covering number, a similarly named term. Note that it does not generalize the winding number but describes covers of a set by balls
Density (polytope), a polyhedral analog
Topological degree theory

Notes

References

External links 
 
Let's get acquainted with the mapping degree , by Rade T. Zivaljevic.

Algebraic topology
Differential topology
Theory of continuous functions